Paul Duda (born c. 1943) was a Canadian football player who played for the 1965 Hamilton Tiger-Cats, 1965-1969 Norfolk Norfolk Neptunes (2) and ended his career in 1970 with the Orlando Panthers (2). He won the Grey Cup with the Hamilton Tiger-Cats in 1965. He played college football at Cortland State University.

References
2. https://www.profootballarchives.com/playerd/duda00400.html

1940s births
Hamilton Tiger-Cats players
Living people